The 2020 Uzbekistan Super Cup was the 6th Uzbekistan Super Cup, an annual football match played between the winners of the previous season's Super League and Cup. As Pakhtakor Tashkent completed a domestic League and Cup Double, second placed Super League Nasaf also took part in the match. Pakhtakor Tashkent won the match 1–0, securing their first Super Cup title.

Match details

See also
2020 Uzbekistan Super League
2020 Uzbekistan Cup

References

2021
Pakhtakor Tashkent FK
FC Nasaf
Supercup